John Edward Lloyd (2 August 1908 – 16 September 1985) was a Liberal party member of the House of Commons of Canada for the Halifax riding. He is a lecturer and chartered accountant by career. He was born in Aldershot, England.

After unsuccessfully campaigning for the riding in the 1962 federal election, he won the seat in the 1963 federal election and served in the 26th Canadian Parliament until 1965. He lost the seat to Progressive Conservative candidates in the 1965 federal election.

References

External links
 

1908 births
1985 deaths
Liberal Party of Canada MPs
Members of the House of Commons of Canada from Nova Scotia
British emigrants to Canada